Philotheca apiculata is a species of flowering plant in the family Rutaceae and is endemic to the south-west of Western Australia. It is a small shrub with narrow club-shaped leaves and small clusters of white to pink flowers on the ends of branchlets.

Description
There are ten stamens each that are free from each other and reddish near the tip.

Taxonomy and naming
This philotheca was first formally described in 1970 by Paul Wilson who gave it the name Eriostemon apiculatus and published the description in the journal Nuytsia from specimens collected near Norseman. In 1998, Wilson changed the name to Philotheca apiculata in the same journal.

Distribution and habitat
Philotheca apiculata grows on ultramafic rock near Holleton and Norseman in Western Australia.

Conservation status
This species is classified as "Priority One" by the Government of Western Australia Department of Parks and Wildlife, meaning that it is known from only one or a few locations which are potentially at risk.

References

apiculata
Flora of Western Australia
Sapindales of Australia
Plants described in 1970
Taxa named by Paul G. Wilson